Heinrich Groß von Trockau (died 1501) was the Prince-Bishop of Bamberg from 1487 to 1501.

The date of Heinrich Groß von Trockau's birth is unknown, but he was already a prebendary of Augsburg Cathedral in 1451.  On 14 March 1452 he became a canon of Bamberg Cathedral.  He graduated from Heidelberg University in 1452.  He was made a deacon on 20 April 1454.

On 1 February 1487 the cathedral chapter of Bamberg Cathedral elected Groß von Trockau to be Prince-Bishop of Bamberg and Pope Innocent VIII confirmed his appointment on 28 March 1487.  He was consecrated as a bishop by Friedrich von Hohenzollern, Prince-Bishop of Augsburg, in Nuremberg on 15 July 1487.

He died in Bamberg on 30 March 1501.

References

1501 deaths
Prince-Bishops of Bamberg
Year of birth unknown